This page's list covers the ferns and allies (Lycopodiopsida, Equisetopsida and Pteridopsida) found in Great Britain and Ireland. For the background to this list see parent article List of the vascular plants of Britain and Ireland.

Status key: * indicates an introduced species and e indicates an extinct species.

Class Lycopodiopsida

Order Lycopodiales

Family Lycopodiaceae (clubmosses)

Order Selaginellales

Family Selaginellaceae (spikemosses)

Order Isoetales

Family Isoetaceae (quillworts)

Class Polypodiopsida (ferns)

Order Equisetales

Family Equisetaceae (horsetails)

Order Ophioglossales

Family Ophioglossaceae (adder's-tongues)

Order Osmundales

Family Osmundaceae (royal ferns)

Order Polypodiales (polypod ferns, cathetogyrates)

Family Pteridaceae (maidenhair fern family)

Family Hymenophyllaceae (filmy ferns, bristle ferns)

Family Polypodiaceae

Family Dennstaedtiaceae (bracken family)

Family Thelypteridaceae (marsh ferns)

Family Aspleniaceae (spleenworts)

Family Woodsiaceae (cliff ferns)

Family Dryopteridaceae (wood ferns)

Order Salviniales

Family Marsileaceae (pepperworts)

Family Salviniaceae

Order Cyatheales (tree ferns etc.)

Family Dicksoniaceae

Family Blechnaceae

See also

Notes
 Jersey fern (Anogramma leptophylla) is present in the Channel Islands as a native species, but does not occur in Britain or Ireland.
 Irish spleenwort (Asplenium onopteris) is native only to Ireland; it is represented in Britain only by an introduced population in North Wales.

External links
 
 
 

01